Bergland Township is a civil township of Ontonagon County in the U.S. state of Michigan.  As of the 2020 census, the township population was 438.

Communities
 Bergland is an unincorporated community and census-designated place within the township, situated at the junction of M-28 and M-64 on the north end of Lake Gogebic in the Ottawa National Forest. The ZIP Code is 49910.
 Lake Gogebic is a census-designated place just west of Bergland and includes the unincorporated communities of Lake Gogebic and Merriweather.

Geography

The civil township comprises two full survey townships, T48N R43W and T49N R43W, and the western half of two others, T48N R42W and T49 R42W. Gogebic County is to the south and to the west of the southern tier of survey townships. Carp Lake Township is to the north and west of the northern tier. Matchwood Township is to the east.

Demographics
As of the census of 2000, there were 550 people, 258 households, and 171 families residing in the township.  The population density was 5.6 per square mile (2.2/km2).  There were 592 housing units at an average density of 6.0 per square mile (2.3/km2).  The racial makeup of the township was 97.45% White, 0.91% Native American, 0.36% Asian, 0.36% Pacific Islander, 0.55% from other races, and 0.36% from two or more races. Hispanic or Latino of any race were 0.18% of the population. 25.4% were of Finnish, 21.7% German, 6.6% Italian, 6.2% Polish, 5.6% Swedish, 5.2% Norwegian and 5.0% French Canadian ancestry according to Census 2000.

There were 258 households, out of which 18.2% had children under the age of 18 living with them, 57.4% were married couples living together, 4.7% had a female householder with no husband present, and 33.7% were non-families. 28.7% of all households were made up of individuals, and 14.3% had someone living alone who was 65 years of age or older.  The average household size was 2.13 and the average family size was 2.59.

In the township the population was spread out, with 14.2% under the age of 18, 6.4% from 18 to 24, 19.8% from 25 to 44, 35.8% from 45 to 64, and 23.8% who were 65 years of age or older.  The median age was 50 years. For every 100 females, there were 107.5 males.  For every 100 females age 18 and over, there were 105.2 males.

The median income for a household in the township was $28,125, and the median income for a family was $32,500. Males had a median income of $25,278 versus $21,000 for females. The per capita income for the township was $15,573.  About 4.1% of families and 8.6% of the population were below the poverty line, including 9.7% of those under age 18 and 6.9% of those age 65 or over.

Climate
The climate is described as Humid Continental by the Köppen Climate System, abbreviated as Dfb.

References

Townships in Ontonagon County, Michigan
Townships in Michigan